Conops is a genus of flies from the family Conopidae. The larvae of Conops are parasitic on bees, especially bumblebees. Adults feed on nectar.

Species
 Subgenus Conops Linnaeus, 1758
 C. ceriaeformis Meigen, 1824
 C. flavicaudus (Bigot, 1880)
 C. flavipes Linnaeus, 1758
 C. maculatus Macquart, 1834
 C. quadrifasciatus De Geer, 1776
 C. rufiventris Macquart, 1849
 C. silaceus Wiedemann in Meigen, 1824
 C. scutellatus Meigen, 1804
 C. strigatus Wiedemann in Meigen, 1824
 C. vesicularis Linnaeus, 1761
 C. vitellinus Loew, 1847
 Subgenus Asiconops Chen, 1939
 C. elegans Meigen, 1824
 C. flavifrons Meigen, 1824
 C. insignis Loew, 1848
 C. longiventris Kröber, 1916
 C. weinbergae Camras & Chvála, 1984

References

Parasitic flies
Parasites of bees
Conopidae
Taxa named by Carl Linnaeus
Conopoidea genera